203 (two hundred [and] three) is the natural number following 202 and preceding 204.

In mathematics
203 is the seventh Bell number, giving the number of partitions of a set of size 6. 203 different triangles can be made from three rods with integer lengths of at most 12, and 203 integer squares (not necessarily of unit size) can be found in a staircase-shaped polyomino formed by stacks of unit squares of heights ranging from 1 to 12.

In other fields
 203 is the HTTP status code indicating non-authoritative information.

See also
 Area code 203, in Connecticut
 The year 203
 Hill 203, near Lüshunkou, China

References

Integers